The Centenary Group of Companies, commonly referred to as the Centenary Group, is a privately owned conglomerate in Uganda. The anchor company in the group is Centenary Bank, the second-largest commercial bank in Uganda, based on assets. As of 31 December 2021 Centenary Bank had assets valued at USh4.8 trillion (US$1.359 billion).

Overview
As of June 2022, Centenary Group is mainly involved in financial services, information and communications technology and the delivery of social services. The shareholders' equity in the group is reported to be USh789.52 billion (US$222.78 million), as of December 2021.

History
Started in 1983 as Centenary Rural Development Trust (CRDT), Centenary bank started serving customers in that role in 1985. In 1993 the Bank of Uganda awarded a commercial banking license to CRDT, transforming it into Centenary Bank.

In March 2019 the board of directors of Centenary Bank resolved to form a group structure. With consent of the Bank of Uganda (BoU), Centenary Group was established on 25 October 2019. On 6 November 2019, "the group formed a banking subsidiary named Centenary Rural Development Bank Limited". The BoU issued a commercial banking license to (CRDBL), on 16 March 2020, effective 1 July 2020. On that date Centenary Group transferred its banking business to CRDBL.

Subsidiary companies
As of June 2022, the companies of the Centenary Group included  the following:

1. Centenary Bank Limited, a large commercial bank.

2. Centenary Technology Services Limited (Cente-Tech), an information and communications company. Responsible for the ICT functions within the group. In the process of developing a Level 3 data centre in the city of Masaka, Uganda.

3. Centenary Foundation, a non-government non-profit organisation, charged with promoting and executing the group's social programs.

4. As of December 2021, Centenary Group was evaluating the opportunity of opening a subsidiary outside Uganda.

See also

 List of conglomerates in Uganda
 List of conglomerates in Africa
 Kampala Capital City Authority
 List of wealthiest people in Uganda

References

External links
 Official Website

 
Companies based in Kampala
Financial services companies established in 2020
Conglomerate companies of Uganda
2020 establishments in Uganda